When That Day Comes, also translated as As the War Approaches, is a Chinese patriotic song written by the People's Liberation Army General Political Department in 2005, with lyrics written by Wang Xiaoling. The song was created in response to a 2004 order by the Propaganda Department of the General Political Department to bolster the morale of military personnel and is about the People's Volunteer Army during the Korean War. The song was inaugurated by the People's Liberation Army on 29 July 2005, in time for the celebrations of the 78th anniversary of the founding of the PLA, at the Olympic Sports Centre in Beijing.

See also
Dong Fang Hong I
The East Is Red (1965 film)
Honglaowai
Maoism
"Ode to the Motherland"
"Sailing the Seas Depends on the Helmsman"
"Without the Communist Party, There Would Be No New China"

Chinese patriotic songs
Chinese military marches